The rondelet is a brief French form of poetry. It contains a refrain, a strict rhyme scheme and a distinct meter pattern.

The roundelay is a 24 line poem written in trochaic tetrameter.  What they have in common is that they both only use two rhyme sounds, and make use of refrains.

Rondelet is the diminutive of rondel, a similar, longer verse form. This is the basic structure:

 Line 1: A—four syllables
 Line 2: b—eight syllables
 Line 3: A—repeat of line one
 Line 4: a—eight syllables
 Line 5: b—eight syllables
 Line 6: b—eight syllables
 Line 7: A—repeat of line one

The refrained lines should contain the same words, however substitution or different use of punctuation on the lines has been common.

Etymology
The term roundelay originates from 1570, from Modern French rondelet, a diminutive of rondel meaning "short poem with a refrain," literally "small circle". From Old French rondel, a diminutive of rond meaning "circle, sphere," originally an adjective from roont. The spelling developed by association with lay (noun) "poem to be sung."

References

Further reading 

 Michel Barrucaud, François Besson, Eric Doumerc, Raphaelle Gosta de Beaurregard, Aurélie Guilain, Wendy Harding, Isabelle Keller-Privat, Catherine Lamone, Lesley Lawton et Sylvie Maurel, An introduction to poetry in English, Presses Universitaires du Mirail, Toulouse.

Western medieval lyric forms
Rhyme
Stanzaic form